Matthew Adam Garber (25 March 1956 – 13 June 1977) was a British child actor who most notably played Michael Banks in the 1964 film Mary Poppins. He appeared in only two other films, The Three Lives of Thomasina and The Gnome-Mobile, all three times appearing alongside actress Karen Dotrice. All three appearances were in movies by Walt Disney Pictures.

Early life
Born in Stepney, London, to parents who had both performed on stage, Garber attended St Paul's Primary School in Winchmore Hill and Highgate School in Highgate, North London, from September 1968 until July 1972. He had a younger brother, Fergus Garber, who was born in 1964, the year Matthew played Michael Banks. His father's name was recorded by the school he had attended as Louis Leonard Garber. Matthew Garber was considered a spirited and bright boy in a 1967 Disney press release that noted his enjoyment of pulling practical jokes on his friends, playing sports, and reading adventure, mythology and poetry books.

Career
As a friend of the Garber family, Karen Dotrice's father, Shakespearean actor Roy Dotrice, called Garber to the attention of Disney Casting, where his use of "artful dodges, like squinting, screwing up his nose, and brushing his hair back with one hand" led to his screen debut at age seven in Disney's The Three Lives of Thomasina (1963).

That same year, both Garber and Thomasina co-star Dotrice were hired to play Jane and Michael, the children of Mr. George Banks (David Tomlinson) and Mrs. Winifred Banks (Glynis Johns), who get more than they bargained for when they hire a nanny named Mary Poppins (Julie Andrews). Disney's live-action animated film adaptation of the Mary Poppins book series by P. L. Travers won five Academy Awards and made its stars world-famous.

Garber and Dotrice teamed up again in 1967 in The Gnome-Mobile, as the grandchildren of a rich lumber mogul (Walter Brennan) who stumble across a gnome forest and are asked to help keep the gnomes from dying off.

Dotrice recalled, "He was how he looked—an imp, and I loved being his shadow. I can't imagine making movies would have been half as much fun without him. He loved being naughty, finding and jumping off of small buildings on the back lot. While I was Victorian proper and wouldn't let myself get dirty or muddy, Matthew had a great sense of fun and danger. He was a daredevil and could have been a race car driver. And he did live a full life over his 21 years."

Death
In 1976, Garber caught hepatitis while in India. By the time he was repatriated to the UK, the disease had spread.
On 13 June 1977, he died at the Royal Free Hospital in Hampstead, London, of haemorrhagic necrotising pancreatitis, aged 21. His body was cremated at St. Marylebone Crematorium (East Finchley, London) on 16 June.

Legacy
Garber was posthumously named a Disney Legend in 2004, with his brother Fergus accepting the award on his behalf. On the Mary Poppins 40th anniversary DVD, Karen Dotrice said she regretted not having kept in touch with Garber before his death.

Filmography

References

Further reading

External links

 
 

1956 births
1977 deaths
20th-century English male actors
Deaths from pancreatitis
Disney people
English male child actors
English male film actors
Male actors from London
People educated at Highgate School
People educated at St Paul's School, London
People from Stepney